Tracy-Lee Botha (born 23 November 1988) is a South African lawn bowler.

Bowls career
In 2011 she won the pairs silver medal at the Atlantic Bowls Championships.

She competed in the women's pairs and the women's fours events at the 2014 Commonwealth Games where she won two gold medals.

She was selected as part of the South Africa team for the 2018 Commonwealth Games on the Gold Coast in Queensland.

References

1988 births
Living people
Bowls players at the 2010 Commonwealth Games
Bowls players at the 2014 Commonwealth Games
Commonwealth Games gold medallists for South Africa
South African female bowls players
Sportspeople from Johannesburg
Commonwealth Games medallists in lawn bowls
Medallists at the 2010 Commonwealth Games
Medallists at the 2014 Commonwealth Games